Jan Frode Nornes (born 8 January 1973) is a Norwegian football coach and former player. He is currently an assistant manager of Eliteserien club Vålerenga.

Career
He's played most of his career with Odd Grenland whom he joined in 1999, but after a shoulder-injury, he was loaned out to 1. divisjon club Strømsgodset autumn 2006. He helped Strømsgodset to promotion to Tippeligaen, and was offered a permanent contract with the team from Drammen, but chose to return home to Vestfold, and Sandefjord.

He previously played for Flint and Eik, in his hometown Tønsberg.

Nornes has been capped 3 times for Norway.

After his retirement as a player, Nornes worked as an assistant coach at his former club Odd. He was the assistant coach of Dag-Eilev Fagermo for 12 years, before Fagermo left the club for Vålerenga in January 2020. Nornes was then promoted to head coach of Odd in March 2020. He was sacked on 8 January 2022. Ahead of the 2023 he was named as assistant manager of Vålerenga, working under his old superior Dag-Eilev Fagermo.

References

External links
 Club profile (archived 2011) 

1973 births
Living people
Sportspeople from Tønsberg
Norwegian footballers
Norway international footballers
Eik-Tønsberg players
Odds BK players
Strømsgodset Toppfotball players
Sandefjord Fotball players
Eliteserien players
Norwegian First Division players
Association football defenders
Norwegian football managers
Odds BK managers
Eliteserien managers
Vålerenga Fotball non-playing staff